Taylors Hill (also Te Taurere), is a volcano in the Auckland volcanic field. It erupted about 33,000 years ago. Its scoria cone reaches 56 m high.

It was the site of a Māori pā (fortification), and retains earthworks from that era such as kumara (sweet potato) pits and terracing. It was most likely first occupied in 1400s, and was an area where ōnewa (greywacke) was quarried to make toki (stone adzes).

Waiorohe (Karaka Bay) was a mooring site of Tainui waka inside the west heads of the Tāmaki. From here Horoiwi left the waka and settled with the Tangata whenua at Te Pane o Horoiwi. Te Keteanataua and Taihaua disembarked and made their way to Taurere, whilst Taikehu and others went on by foot to explore the upper reaches of the river and the shores of the Manukau Harbour. The Karaka trees of the bay descend from the sacred Karaka grove Te Uru-Karaka a Parehuia of Taurere Pa.

Until the 18th century the area around Taylors Hill was the traditional eastern boundary for Waiohua lands, After the pā was attacked by Ngāti Whātua around the year 1750, Waiohua retreated to South Auckland. Ngāti Whātua gifted the land to Ngāti Pāoa in the late 1700s.

The volcano is named for William Taylor, who purchased the land in 1845. The volcano's lower slopes and scoria mounds to the east and south were quarried away following European settlement, with only the north-west section of the volcanic area remaining. The area around the volcanic cone became a public reserve in the 1920s.

References

City of Volcanoes: A geology of Auckland - Searle, Ernest J.; revised by Mayhill, R.D.; Longman Paul, 1981. First published 1964. .
Volcanoes of Auckland: The Essential Guide. Hayward, B.W., Murdoch, G., Maitland, G.; Auckland University Press, 2011.
Volcanoes of Auckland: A Field Guide. Hayward, B.W.; Auckland University Press, 2019, 335 pp. .

External links
Photograph of Te Taurere held in Auckland Libraries' heritage collections.
Origin story of Taurere - Ethnologist and author David Simmons tells the tragic love story of Parehuia, daughter of the great Ngāti Awa chief Titahi, and Turangimua of the Aotea canoe. The story culminates with a once famous lament composed by the couple's daughter Ruahine from which the name Taurere (now called Taylors Hill) takes its origin.

Auckland volcanic field